Gautier Lloris (born 18 July 1995) is a French professional footballer who plays as a centre-back for  club Le Havre.

Club career
On 4 January 2016, Lloris made his full debut in Nice's 2–2 draw against Rennes in the Coupe de France.

On 12 July 2022, Lloris signed a two-year contract with Le Havre.

Personal life
He is the younger brother of Hugo Lloris, a France international.

Career statistics

References

External links
 

Living people
1995 births
Footballers from Nice
Association football central defenders
French footballers
France youth international footballers
Ligue 1 players
Ligue 2 players
OGC Nice players
Gazélec Ajaccio players
AJ Auxerre players
Le Havre AC players
French people of Catalan descent